Petter Hemming (born 17 February 1999) is a Finnish professional footballer who plays for FC Åland, as a centre back.

Career

Club career
Hemming signed a two-year professional contract with IFK Mariehamn on 24 November 2016 and was promoted to the first team squad, after having played three Kakkonen games on loan for FC Åland.

On 2 July 2017, Hemming played his first Veikkausliiga match for IFK Mariehamn in a game against VPS. On 7 November 2019 FC Åland confirmed, that Hemming had returned to the club, this time on a permanent basis.

References

External links

1999 births
Living people
Finnish footballers
IFK Mariehamn players
FC Åland players
Kakkonen players
Veikkausliiga players
Association football defenders